The 2004–05 UEFA Cup was the 34th edition of the UEFA Cup. The format of the competition had changed from previous seasons, replacing that from the previous one after the abolition of the Cup Winners' Cup in 1999; an extra qualifying round was introduced, as was a group phase after the first round.  The group stage operated in a single round-robin format consisting of eight groups of five teams, each team plays two games at home and two away and the top three finishers of each group progress to the knock-out round, joining the eight third-placed teams from the UEFA Champions League group stage.

The tournament was won by CSKA Moscow, coming from behind in the final against Sporting CP, in whose home stadium the match was played. It was the first win by a Russian side in any European competition. The match was refereed by Graham Poll.

Valencia were the defending champions, but were eliminated by Steaua București in the Round of 32 after dropping out of the UEFA Champions League Group Stage.

Teams
The labels in the parentheses show how each team qualified for the place of its starting round:
 TH: Title holders
 CW: Cup winners
 CR: Cup runners-up
 LC: League Cup winners
 Nth: League position
 PO: End-of-season European competition play-offs (winners or position)
 IC: Intertoto Cup
 FP: Fair play
 CL: Relegated from the Champions League
 GS: Third-placed teams from the group stage
 Q3: Losers from the third qualifying round

Notes

Qualifying rounds

First qualifying round

Second qualifying round

First round

|}
 Due to a general strike in Israel, the first leg was cancelled by UEFA.

Group stage

Based on paragraph 4.06 in the UEFA regulations for the current season, tiebreakers, if necessary, are applied in the following order:
Cumulative goal difference in group matches.
Total goals scored in group matches.
Away goals scored in group matches.
Higher number of UEFA coefficient points accumulated by the club in question, as well as its association, over the previous five seasons (see paragraph 6.03 of the UEFA regulations).

Group A

Group B

Group C

Group D

Group E

Group F

Group G

Group H

Knockout stage

Bracket

Round of 32

|}

Round of 16

|}

Quarter-finals

|}

Semi-finals

|}

Final

Top goalscorers

See also
2004–05 UEFA Champions League
2005 UEFA Super Cup
2004 UEFA Intertoto Cup

Notes

References

External links

2004–05 All matches UEFA Cup – season at UEFA website
Official Site
Results at RSSSF.com
 All scorers 2004–05 UEFA Cup according to (excluding preliminary round) according to protocols UEFA + all scorers preliminary round
2004/05 UEFA Cup – results and line-ups (archive)
Inaugural group stage draws closer – 2004/05 UEFA Cup group stage seeding pots

 
2004–05 in European football
UEFA Cup seasons